Tomales Point is the North-Western tip of Point Reyes Peninsula. Bodega Bay is to the North, Tomales Bay is to the East, and the Pacific Ocean is to the West. The point is accessible only via a 9.5 mile hike (out and back) along Tomales Point Trail. The region is home to a tule elk population.

Gallery

References

External links

Point Reyes National Seashore